Mok, also known as Amok, Hsen-Hsum, and Muak, is a possibly extinct Angkuic language spoken in Shan State, Myanmar and in Lampang Province, Thailand. In Lampang, 7 speakers were reported by Wurm & Hattori (1981).

Varieties
Hall & Devereux (2018) report that five varieties of Mok are spoken in Shan State, Myanmar, providing the following comparative vocabulary table. These varieties have some lexical similarity (the lowest being 88%) with each other, but very low lexical similarity with the other Angkuic languages. Owen (2018) dubs these varieties Hwe Law, Chieng Kham, Pha Lam, Punglong, and Hwe Koi.

Geographic distribution 
Tannumsaeng (2020) describes three locations for Mok: between Mong Khet and Mong Yang and south of Kengtung in Myanmar, and on the Thai-Burmese border in Chiang Rai Province, Thailand.

Phonology 
Tannumsaeng (2020), citing Hall & Devereux (2018), provides the following phonology for Mok.

The consonants are /pʰ p m f w tʰ t n s l r c ɲ j kʰ k ŋ ʔ h/, with reduced /m̩ n̩ ɲ̩ ŋ̩ pə tə kə sə/. /f/ and /r/ only appear in certain varieties. The vowels are /i e ɛ u ɯ o ɤ ɔ a/, with the diphthongs /ia ɯa ua/. Mok has two tones, one low and one high.

References and notes

Further reading
Hall, Elizabeth. 2010. A Phonology of Muak Sa-aak. M.A. thesis. Chiang Mai, Thailand: Payap University.
Shintani, Tadahiko. 2019. The Sen Tsum (I-Mok) language. Linguistic survey of Tay cultural area (LSTCA) no. 121. Tokyo: Research Institute for Languages and Cultures of Asia and Africa (ILCAA).

External links 
 RWAAI (Repository and Workspace for Austroasiatic Intangible Heritage)
 http://hdl.handle.net/10050/00-0000-0000-0003-9671-C@view Mok in RWAAI Digital Archive

Palaungic languages
Endangered Austroasiatic languages